Hattie Naylor is an English playwright. Her 2009 Ivan and the Dogs won the Tinniswood Award for original radio drama and was nominated in the 2010 Olivier Awards for Outstanding Contribution to Theatre. It has since been developed into a film directed by Andrew Kôtting called Lek and the Dogs (2018).  Other productions include Weighting Extraordinary Bodies, national tour 2015/16.  Her work as a librettist includes Picard in Space with Will Gregory (Goldfrapp) directed by Jude Kelly, for the Electronica Festival at the Southbank 2012.  The Night Watch, her adaptation of Sarah Water’s novel, Manchester Royal Exchange, was listed as one of the top theatre plays of the year by the Suzanna Clapp, Observer for 2016. Further credits include Yana and the Yeti with Pickled Image 2017, and As the Crow Flies Pentabus and Salisbury Playhouse 2017.  Going Dark was co-written and created with Sound&Fury, Young Vic and Science Museum 2013/14, and her controversial Bluebeard directed by Lee Lyford and created with their own company Gallivant, Soho theatre, Bristol Old Vic 2013. She has written extensively for BBC Radio 4 notably: The Diaries Of Samuel Pepys nominated Best Radio Drama 2012, The Aeneid nominated Best Radio Adaptation, BBC Audio awards 2013, and How to Survive the Roman Empire; The letters of Pliny 2016.  She is a lecturer in stage and screen at Sheffield Hallam University.

She studied dance at Nottingham Trent University and fine art at Slade School of Fine Art.

Work
Naylor has had more than 50 plays broadcast on BBC Radio 3 or BBC Radio 4.

Her first play, The Box, was broadcast in 1988 as part of Radio 4's "Young playwrights festival".

In 2018 she adapted Alexandre Dumas' The Three Musketeers for The Dukes' promenade production in Williamson Park, Lancaster; in her version D'Artagnan, played by Lucy Jane Parkinson, was a young woman aspiring to become a musketeer.
 
Her works include:
The Night Watch, Manchester Royal Exchange 2016
The Diaries Of Samuel Pepys (2012)
 The Aeneid (2013)
Bluebeard, Soho Theatre (2013)
Going Dark co-written with Sound&Fury 
 Redeveloping Weighting with Extraordinary Bodies, 2015

References

External links

Year of birth missing (living people)
Living people
English dramatists and playwrights
English women dramatists and playwrights
Alumni of Nottingham Trent University
Alumni of the Slade School of Fine Art